Cela is a Spanish-Galician surname. Notable people with the surname include:
 Alfonso Cela (1885–1932), Spanish bullfighter
 Camilo José Cela (1916–2002), Spanish Nobel Prize winning writer
 Camilo José Cela Conde (born 1946), Spanish writer and professor of philosophy, son of the former
 Gabriel Hernán Cela (born 1974), Argentine footballer
 Izolda Cela (born 1960), Brazilian professor, psychologist and politician
 José María Cela (born 1969), Spanish footballer and academic
 Paloma Cela (1946–2019), Spanish actress and model
 Pedro Pardo de Cela (1425–1483), Marshal of Galicia, beheaded by order of the Catholic Monarchs
 Violeta Cela (born 1960), Spanish actress

See also 

 Cella (surname)
 Sela (surname)

References

Galician-language surnames